Robert J. Butera (born January 21, 1935) is a former Republican member of the Pennsylvania House of Representatives.

References

Republican Party members of the Pennsylvania House of Representatives
Philadelphia Flyers executives
New Jersey Devils executives
Living people
People from Norristown, Pennsylvania
1935 births